Zaoyang is a city in the north of Hubei province, People's Republic of China, bordering Henan province to the north. Administratively, it is a county-level city under the administration of Xiangyang.
At the 2010 census its population was 1,004,741 inhabitants even though its built-up (or metro) area is much smaller.

History
Remains dating back to the Warring States period (771 - 221 BCE) have been found near the city.
Zaoyang was the site of two major battles during the Second Sino-Japanese War, the Battle of Suixian-Zaoyang and the Battle of Zaoyang-Yichang.

Geography and climate 

Zaoyang has a monsoon-influenced, four season humid subtropical climate (Köppen Cwa), with cold, damp (but comparatively dry), winters, and hot, humid summers. Precipitation peaks from May to August. The city receives an average 2,100 hours of sunshine per year.

Administrative divisions
Three subdistricts:
Beicheng Subdistrict, Nancheng Subdistrict, Huancheng Subdistrict

Twelve towns:
Juwan, Qifang, Yangdang, Taiping, Xinshi, Lutou, Liusheng, Xinglong, Wangcheng, Wudian, Xiongji, Pinglin

Other areas:
Zaoyang Economic Zone, Suiyang, Chehe

Transport
Zaoyang is served by the Hankou–Danjiangkou Railway.

Notable people 
 Emperor Guangwu of Han, creator of the Eastern Han dynasty, born in Zaoyang in 5 BCE.
 Nie Haisheng, Flight Engineer of China's 2005 Shenzhou 6 manned spacecraft expedition, born in Zaoyang in 1964.

References

Xiangyang